Ásgeir Gunnar Ásgeirsson (born 3 June 1980) is an Icelandic former footballer who capped three times for the Iceland national team.

Playing career
After starting his career with Stjarnan, he joined FH prior to the 2002 season. He played with FH until 2011, scoring 19 goals in 123 league matches.

In March 2012, Ásgeir joined Fram . He appeared in 16 league matches for the team, scoring once. A practicing dentist since 2010, he announced his retirement from football in January 2013 to focus on furthering his education in the field.

References

External links
 
 

1980 births
Living people
Association football midfielders
Icelandic footballers
Iceland international footballers
Fimleikafélag Hafnarfjarðar players
Furman Paladins men's soccer players
Knattspyrnufélagið Fram players
Stjarnan players